

Events

May events
 May – First section of Carmarthenshire Railway opens, the first public railway in Wales.

July events
 July 26 - The Surrey Iron Railway formally opens throughout, first public railway in England.

Births

June births 
 June 10 – Anson P. Morrill, president of Maine Central Railroad 1864–1866 and 1873–1875 (d. 1887).

October births
 October 16 – Robert Stephenson, English civil engineer and steam locomotive builder.

November births
 November 9 - Henry Farnam, president of the Chicago, Rock Island and Pacific Railroad 1854–1863 (d. 1883).

Deaths

References